Family & Friends Party is a video game developed by Spanish studio Gammick Entertainment for WiiWare. It was released in North America on March 2, 2009 and in the PAL regions on April 10, 2009.

Overview
Family & Friends Party is a minigame compilation for multiple players, with individuals or teams competing to complete all six games within a certain number of turns. The six minigames include variations and clones of hangman, charades, Simon and Pictionary.

Reception
IGN gave it 5.9/10, believing that players will only get the most enjoyment out of it with many players gathered together. WiiWare World echoed these sentiments and also felt that while it featured decent production values, it suffered from unbalanced gameplay and a steep asking price. They gave it 5/10.

References

2009 video games
Wii-only games
WiiWare games
Party video games
Video games developed in Spain
Wii games
Multiplayer and single-player video games
Gammick Entertainment games